The Green line is a rapid transit line in Taichung as part of Taichung Metro. The line was briefly opened to the public on 16 November 2020, but closed on 22 November due to faulty couplers on the trains. The line officially re-entered service on 25 April 2021, becoming Taiwan's fifth rapid transit system in operation. Two extensions, one heading east to Dakeng and the other reaching south into Changhua, are also planned.

Route overview

The current line is known as the Wuri-Wenxin-Beitun Line (烏日文心北屯線). It begins in Beitun District at Beitun Main Station and runs westward, crossing the TRA Taichung Line at Songzhu station. Then, it follows Wenxin Road, passing through Xitun and Nantun districts and forming a wide semicircle around the city center. At Daqing station, the line runs parallel to the Taichung Line until its western terminus at Taichung HSR Station in Wuri. The line is fully elevated except for small sections at both termini.

Planned extensions
There are two planned extensions to the line. The first, known as the Dakeng Extension, branches east from Jiushe station and runs along Songzhu Road to the base of Dakeng. The second, known as the Changhua Extension, runs west past Taichung HSR Station and crosses the Dadu River to Changhua. The extensions add two and five more stations respectively, and will cost an additional $25 billion NTD.

History

Planning and construction 

A metro system in Taichung was discussed since 1990, which would connect various suburbs including Caotun, Zhongxing New Village, and others. The plan was dropped due to high cost and low projected ridership. A new proposal was renewed and approved in 2004, but construction did not begin immediately because of costs exceeding estimates and disagreements over where stations would be.

In 2010, preliminary work began by relocating trees on the median and rerouting the utilities that run under those roads. Progress was plagued by various delays, including conflicts between the city and electrical contractors, problems with land acquisition, and the bankruptcy of a major utilities contractor. Because of the delays, mayor Jason Hu and his administration were heavily criticized by rivaling political parties.

Formal construction began in May 2013. Two separate incidents occurred during construction. On 19 August 2014, a crane malfunctioned and broke off its arm, falling on top of a restaurant. No injuries were reported. Then, on 10 April 2015, a crane's arm snapped while lifting a 209-ton I-beam, causing the beam to fall and crushing a car underneath. Workers atop the beam were also thrown off. The driver of the car and three workers lost their lives, while four other works sustained heavy injuries. Construction was halted for three months following the incident. On 30 June 2016, construction of the line was completed, and testing began soon after.

Initially, the stations numbers were numbered sequentially from G1 to G20, with the "G" representing green. However, since G8 is pronounced similar to chi-bai, which is considered profane in Hokkien, the "G" prefix was changed to "1", which represents how the Green line is the first line completed. The station's English names were initially written in a mix of Tongyong Pinyin and Hanyu Pinyin, and the lack of standardization drew criticism. On 24 August 2020, the Taichung City Council decided to use Hanyu Pinyin for all stations except for Sihwei Elementary School.

Operations 
Beginning on 16 November 2020, the Green line was opened to the public for testing and was free to ride until its formal opening ceremony planned for on 19 December. On the first day, 70,977 passengers used the line. However, on 21 November, the couplers on one of the trains snapped in half; the line was closed to the public the next day. Then, on 27 November, another coupler was found to be broken.

Trial runs resumed on 25 March 2021. A opening ceremony was held on 25 April 2021.

Rolling stock
The line runs eighteen EMU trains equipped with automatic train operation. The trains are powered by a direct current, 750 V third rail. Each train has a capacity of roughly 536 people divided into two cars, each car having ten doors and two air conditioning units. Of the eighteen trains, nine are built by Kawasaki Heavy Industries in Kobe, Japan, while the remaining nine are built by Taiwan Rolling Stock Company.

Station list

Wuri-Wenxin-Beitun Line

Dakeng Extension

Changhua Extension

References

External links

Taichung Metro
Transportation in Taichung
Proposed public transportation in Taiwan